Ali Naqi (علی نقی), also spelled as Ali Naghi, may refer to:
Ali Naqi, alternate name of Sarab-e Alinaqi, a village in Iran
Alinaqi-ye Olya, a village in Iran
Alinaqi-ye Sofla, a village in Iran
Ali al-Hadi, also known as Ali al-Naqi, the 10th Shia Imam
Ali Naqi Naqvi (1905–1988), Indian grand ayatollah
Ali-Naqi Vaziri (1887–1979), Iranian musicologist
Mohammad Ali Naqi, Bangladeshi architect and the vice-chancellor of Stamford University Bangladesh

Arabic masculine given names